Balluta Bay is a bay on the northeast coast of Malta within St. Julian's.  It is a popular recreation spot used for swimming, diving, and water sports, with a triangular pjazza surrounded by cafés and shaded by Judas trees.  Its skyline is dominated by the neo-gothic Carmelite Parish Church and the art nouveau Balluta Buildings, which are apartment buildings on the eastern shore, as well as a cluster of terraced townhouses in the local variant of Georgian-style architecture.  The south shore of Balluta Bay features Le Méridien St. Julian's Hotel, built on the grounds surrounding the 18th-century Villa Cassar Torregiani.

External links

Our Lady of Mont Carmel on Emporis.com
Balluta Buildings on Emporis.com

Bays of Malta
Beaches of Malta
St. Julian's, Malta